Byomkesh Phire Elo is a 2014 Indian mystery thriller film on Bengali fictional detective Byomkesh Bakshi, released on 19 December 2014. The film is directed by Anjan Dutt. This is the third installment of Byomkesh series By Anjan Dutt, serving as a sequel to Byomkesh Bakshi and Abar Byomkesh. The film is based on Beni Sanghar by Sharadindu Bandyopadhyay.

Plot
Benimadhab (Biswajit Chakraborty), a rich businessman is under the impression that someone is trying to kill him, but is not able to find out who. He appoints Byomkesh (Abir Chatterjee) to find out. While Byomkesh starts investigating (with his sidekick Ajit (Saswata Chatterjee) narrating the events), Benimadhab is murdered. The inquest into this gruesome act reveals some dark secrets of Benimadhab's family members.

Cast
Abir Chatterjee as Byomkesh Bakshi
Saswata Chatterjee as Ajit
Ushasie Chakraborty as Satyabati
Biswajit Chakraborty as Benimadhab
Chandan Sen as Ajay, Benimadhab's son
Locket Chatterjee as Arati, Benimadhab's daughter-in-law
Kaushik Sen as Gangadhar, Benimadhab's son-in-law
Anjana Basu as Gayetri, Benimadhab's daughter
Ankita Chakraborty as Medini, wife of Meghraj, the bodyguard of Benimadhab
Sampurna Lahiri as Laboni, Ajay and Arati's daughter
Rahul Banerjee as Sanat, Benimadhab's  distant nephew
Ena Saha as Jhilli, Gangadhar and Gayetri's daughter
Subhra Sourav Das as Mokorondo, Ajay and Arati's son

Sequel
The next installment of this series starring Jisshu Sengupta as Byomkesh Bakshi instead, released the following year on 16 October. It is based on Kohen Kobi Kalidas by Sharadindu Bandyopadhyay and titled as Byomkesh Bakshi once again.

See also
 Byomkesh Bakshi
 Abar Byomkesh

References

External links
Byomkesh Phire Elo at the Internet Movie Database
Byomkesh Phire Elo (2014) Movie Review; Anjan Dutt Makes Way for a Grand Return of the Suave Sleuth

2014 films
Bengali-language Indian films
Indian detective films
2010s Bengali-language films
2014 crime thriller films
Films directed by Anjan Dutt
Byomkesh Bakshi films
Films based on works by Saradindu Bandopadhyay